
Gmina Gaszowice is a rural gmina (administrative district) in Rybnik County, Silesian Voivodeship, in southern Poland.

The gmina contains part of the protected area called Rudy Landscape Park.

Villages
Gmina Gaszowice contains the villages and settlements of Czernica, Gaszowice, Łuków, Piece and Szczerbice.

Neighbouring gminas
Gmina Gaszowice is bordered by the towns of Pszów and Rydułtowy, and by the gminas of Jejkowice and Lyski.

Twin towns – sister cities

Gmina Gaszowice is twinned with:
 Krompachy, Slovakia

References

Gaszowice
Rybnik County